Las Rozas de Valdearroyo is a municipality located in the autonomous community of Cantabria, Spain.

Localities

 La Aguilera.
 Arroyo.
 Bimón.
 Bustasur.
 Llano.
 Renedo.
 Las Rozas (Capital).
 Villanueva.

References

Municipalities in Cantabria